Air traffic flow management (ATFM) is the regulation of air traffic in order to avoid exceeding airport or air traffic control capacity in handling traffic (hence the alternative name of Air Traffic Flow and Capacity Management - ATFCM), and to ensure that available capacity is used efficiently.

Airport capacity
Because only one aircraft can land or depart from a runway at a given time, and because aircraft must be separated by a certain distance or time to avoid collisions, every airport has a finite capacity; it can safely handle only so many aircraft per hour. This capacity depends on many factors, such as the number of runways available, layout of taxi tracks, availability of air traffic control, and current or anticipated weather. The weather can cause large variations in capacity; strong winds may limit the number of runways available, and poor visibility may necessitate increases in separation between aircraft.

When an air traffic control unit that will control a flight reaches capacity, arriving aircraft are directed towards holding patterns where they circle until it is their turn to land. However, aircraft flying in circles is an inefficient and costly way of delaying aircraft, so it is preferable to keep them on the ground at their place of departure, called a ground delay program. This way, the delay can be waited out on the ground with engines off, saving considerable amounts of fuel. The careful calculation of en route time for each flight and traffic flow as a whole, which aims to minimize overall delays in the air traffic system, is highly dependent on computers.

Operation in Europe
All IFR flight plans are tracked by the Central Flow Management Unit (CFMU). Every airport and air traffic control sector has a published maximum capacity. When capacity is exceeded, measures are taken to reduce the traffic. This is termed regulation. The aim is to use capacity effectively, keeping the average delay as low as possible, while ensuring capacity is not exceeded.

For example, if two flights are scheduled to arrive at an airport at exactly the same time, and the airport can handle one aircraft every five minutes, the aircraft may be assigned delays to ensure that the second aircraft arrives five minutes after the first. Similarly, the first aircraft will be required to depart on schedule and not allowed to depart late. This way, the second aircraft will not need to enter a holding pattern before landing.

See also
 Bay of Bengal Cooperative Air Traffic Flow Management System (BOBCAT)

References

External links
 FAA Air Traffic Control System Command Center home page

Air traffic control
Air traffic management